Karad was a Lok Sabha parliamentary constituency in Maharashtra from 1957 to 2009. The parts of constituency were delimited to Satara and Sangli Lok Sabha constituencies.

Members of Parliament

^ by-poll

See also
 Karad
 List of Constituencies of the Lok Sabha

References

 

Former Lok Sabha constituencies of Maharashtra
Former constituencies of the Lok Sabha
2008 disestablishments in India
Constituencies disestablished in 2008